Brian Thomas McConnell (born January 21, 1950) is a former American football linebacker who played for the Buffalo Bills and the Houston Oilers of the National Football League (NFL). He played college football at Michigan State University.

McConnell played two years in Peddie School in Hightstown, New Jersey, mostly as an offensive lineman, becoming team captain, earning high school All-American Honors, and graduating in 1969. He attended Michigan State University, graduating in 1973. He was drafted in the seventh round to the Buffalo Bills where he played tight end, and was traded to the Houston Oilers where he would play 7 games that season as a linebacker. In 1974 he was slated to report to the New England Patriots camp, but walked out as part of the strike that year. He finished his NFL career with the Miami Dolphins in 1977.

Post-football career 
After leaving football, McConnell got his MBA at Stanford University. He serves as the vice-president of the NFL Alumni Association, Northern California Chapter. He is a partner in HPN Neurologic, a company that works on concussion diagnostics and treatment. In 2018, he posted that he survived a transplant to deal with liver cancer.

References 

1950 births
Living people
American football linebackers
Michigan State Spartans football players
Buffalo Bills players
Houston Oilers players
Peddie School alumni
Sportspeople from Passaic, New Jersey